Solamors was a Christian metal band, that formed in 2012. The band has become a project of members of Becoming the Archetype, Aletheian, and UnTeachers.

Members

Discography
 Depravity's Demise (2013)

References

External links
Solamors on Facebook

Musical groups established in 2012
American Christian metal musical groups
American melodic death metal musical groups
Heavy metal musical groups from Pennsylvania
2012 establishments in the United States